Modibo Sagnan (born 14 April 1999) is a French professional footballer who plays as a centre-back for Eredivisie club Utrecht, on loan from Spanish club Real Sociedad.

Club career

Lens
A youth product of RC Lens, Sagnan signed his first professional contract with them on 28 July 2017, tying him down to the club for three years. Sagnan made his professional debut for Lens in a 1–0 Ligue 2 loss to FC Sochaux-Montbéliard on 30 January 2018.

Real Sociedad
On 30 January 2019, Sagnan joined La Liga side Real Sociedad for an estimated fee of €5 million, and was immediately loaned back to Lens for the remainder of the season. The following 31 January, after failing to make a first team appearance, he was loaned to Segunda División side CD Mirandés until June.

Sagnan made his debut for the Txuri-urdin on 3 October 2020, replacing Andoni Gorosabel in a 3–0 home win over Getafe CF. On 31 August of the following year, after featuring sparingly, he moved to Portuguese Primeira Liga side C.D. Tondela on a one-year loan deal.

On 11 July 2022, Sagnan was loaned to Utrecht in the Netherlands, with an option to buy.

Personal life
Sagnan was born in France to a Burkinabé father and a Malian mother. He was raised a Muslim.

Career statistics

Honours
Real Sociedad
 Copa del Rey: 2019–20

References

External links

 
 
 
 

1999 births
Living people
Sportspeople from Saint-Denis, Seine-Saint-Denis
French footballers
Association football defenders
Ligue 2 players
RC Lens players
La Liga players
Segunda División players
Primeira Liga players
Real Sociedad footballers
CD Mirandés footballers
C.D. Tondela players
FC Utrecht players
French expatriate footballers
Expatriate footballers in Spain
Expatriate footballers in Portugal
Expatriate footballers in the Netherlands
French expatriate sportspeople in Spain
French expatriate sportspeople in Portugal
French expatriate sportspeople in the Netherlands
Olympic footballers of France
Footballers at the 2020 Summer Olympics
French sportspeople of Burkinabé descent
Sportspeople of Burkinabé descent
French sportspeople of Malian descent
Footballers from Seine-Saint-Denis